Morten Pettersen can refer to:

 Morten Pettersen (footballer, born 1909)
 Morten Pettersen (footballer, born 1970)